Fotomaç is a Turkish sports daily-published and online sports newspaper.

History 
Fotomaç was founded by Turkish media congolmorate Dinç Bilgin in 1991. The newspaper was merged with another newspaper owned by Bilgin, and renamed as Pas-Fotomaç before being sold to Ciner Holding, in 2003.
The newspaper was acquired by Çalık Holding within a package of assets active in media industry, amounting US$ 1.1 billion, in scope of a public tender placed by Savings Deposit Insurance Fund of Turkey in 2007.

References

External links 
 Official website
1991 establishments in Turkey
Publications established in 1991
Daily newspapers published in Turkey
Newspapers published in Istanbul
Sports newspapers
Sports mass media in Turkey
Turkish-language newspapers
Eyüp